Luo Hao (born 17 January 1995) is a Chinese footballer who currently plays for Chinese Super League side Chongqing Dangdai Lifan.

Club career
Luo Hao joined Chinese League One club Nei Mongol Zhongyou in 2016. Luo made his senior debut on 11 May 2016 against top-tier giants Guangzhou Evergrande in the 2016 Chinese FA Cup. He was sent off during the match, which resulted Nei Mongol's 2–0 loss. On 4 June 2016, he made his league debut in a 1–0 win over Beijing Enterprises. He became a regular starter after the match until he suffered an arm fracture in October 2016, which ruling him out for the rest of the season. Luo returned to field in the 2017 season. He continued his promising performances in the league, making 23 appearances for the club.

On 2 January 2018, Luo transferred to Chinese Super League side Chongqing Dangdai Lifan. He made his debut for the club on 3 March 2018, playing the whole match in a 1–0 home win against Beijing Renhe. On 19 May 2018, he scored his first senior goal in a 2–1 away defeat against Hebei China Fortune.

Career statistics
.

References

External links
 

1995 births
Living people
Chinese footballers
Footballers from Shenyang
Inner Mongolia Zhongyou F.C. players
Chongqing Liangjiang Athletic F.C. players
Chinese Super League players
China League One players
Association football defenders